T. gardneri may refer to:
 Thomasia gardneri, the Mount Holland Thomasia, a plant species in the genus Thomasia
 Tillandsia gardneri, a plant species native to Brazil and Venezuela

See also 
 Gardneri